Captorhinidae (also known as cotylosaurs) is an extinct family of tetrapods, traditionally considered primitive reptiles, known from the late Carboniferous to the Late Permian. They had a cosmopolitan distribution across Pangea.

Description

Captorhinids are a clade of small to very large lizard-like reptiles that date from the late Carboniferous through the Permian. Their skulls were much stronger than those of their relatives, the Protorothyrididae, and had teeth that were better able to deal with tough plant material. The postcranial skeleton is very similar to that of advanced reptiliomorph amphibians, so much in fact that the amphibian Seymouriamorpha and Diadectomorpha were thought to be reptiles and grouped together in "Cotylosauria" as the first reptiles in the early 20th century. Captorhinids have broad, robust skulls that are generally triangular in shape when seen in dorsal view. The premaxillae are characteristically downturned. The largest captorhinid, the herbivorous Moradisaurus, could reach an estimated snout-vent length of 2 meters (6.5 feet). Early, smaller forms possessed single rows of teeth, and were likely carnivorous or omnivorous, while the larger, more derived captorhinids belonging to the subfamily Moradisaurinae were herbivorous and developed multiple (up to 11) rows of teeth in the jaws alongside propalinal (back and forth) jaw motion, which created an effective apparatus for grinding and shredding plant matter.

Histological and SEM analysis of captorhinid tail vertebrae concluded in a 2018 study that captorhinids were the first amniotes to develop caudal autotomy as a defensive function. In studied specimens a split line is present in certain caudal vertebrae that is similar to those found in modern reptiles that perform caudal autonomy. This behaviour represented significant evolutionary benefit for the animals, allowing for escape and distracting predators, as well as minimizing blood loss at an injury site.

Discovery and history
Until recently, Concordia cunninghami was thought to be the basalmost known member of Captorhinidae. A novel phylogenic study of primitive reptile relationships by Muller & Reisz in 2006 recovered Thuringothyris as a sister taxon of the Captorhinidae. The same results were obtained in later phylogenic analyses. Concordia is still the earliest known captorhinid as all other captorhinid taxa are known only from Permian deposits.

Captorhinidae contains a single subfamily, the Moradisaurinae. Moradisaurinae was named and assigned to the family Captorhinidae by A. D. Ricqlès and P. Taquet in 1982. Moradisaurinae was defined as "all captorhinids more closely related to Moradisaurus than to Captorhinus". The moradisaurines inhabited what is now China, Morocco, Niger, Russia, Texas and  Oklahoma. 

Captorhinids were once thought to be the ancestors of turtles. The Middle Permian reptile Eunotosaurus from South Africa was seen as the "missing link" between cotylosaurs and chelonians throughout much of the early 20th century. However, more recent fossil finds have shown that Eunotosaurus is a parareptile unrelated to either turtles or captorhinids.

Classification

Taxonomy
The following taxonomy follows Reisz et al., 2011 and Sumida et al., 2010 unless otherwise noted.

Family Captorhinidae
 Captorhinoides?
 Acrodenta
 Baeotherates
 Captorhinus
 Euconcordia
 Labidosauriscus
 Opisthodontosaurus
 Protocaptorhinus
 Reiszorhinus
 Rhiodenticulatus
 Romeria
 Saurorictus
 Thuringothyris
 Subfamily Moradisaurinae
 Balearosaurus
 Captorhinikos
 Gansurhinus
 Gecatogomphius
 Kahneria
 Labidosaurikos
 Labidosaurus
 Moradisaurus
 Rothianiscus
 Dubious Captorhinids
 Puercosaurus
 Riabininus
 Chamasaurus

Phylogeny
The cladogram below was recovered in a study by Sumida et al., 2010.

The cladogram below follows the topology from a 2011 analysis by paleontologists Robert R. Reisz, Jun Liu, Jin-Ling Li and Johannes Müller.

The majority of phylogenetic studies recover captorhinids as basal members of Eureptilia; however, Simões et al. (2022) recover them as stem-amniotes instead, as the sister group to Protorothyris archeri, while the clade including captorhinids and P. archeri is recovered as the sister group to Araeoscelidia.

References

Prehistoric reptile families
Carboniferous reptiles
Permian reptiles
 
Pennsylvanian first appearances
Lopingian extinctions
Taxa named by Ermine Cowles Case